The Otterman Empire is a third-person shooter party video game developed and published by British indie studio Tri-Heart Interactive. The game was released for Microsoft Windows, Xbox One and Nintendo Switch on July 2, 2020.

Gameplay
The Otterman Empire is a multiplayer third-person shooter party game. It has a single player and four-player couch-co-op campaign mode and players can battle against one another in a player verus player mode. Each player has several characters to choose from, each equipped with unique weapons. Players are able to unlock skins and customize their characters. Players fight across the galaxy of the Otterman Empire. When exploring each map, players can find a range of weapons and unique abilities to pick up and use.

References

External links
 

2020 video games
Cooperative video games
Indie video games
Multiplayer online games
Nintendo Switch games
Third-person shooters
Unreal Engine games
Video games developed in the United Kingdom
Windows games
Xbox One games